For elements that are solid at standard temperature and pressure the table gives the crystalline structure of the most thermodynamically stable form(s) in those conditions. In all other cases the structure given is for the element at its melting point (H, He, N, O, F, Ne, Cl, Ar, Kr, Xe, and Rn are gases at STP; Br, Hg, and probably Cn and Fl are liquids at STP). Predictions are given for At, Fr, elements 100–113 and 118, which have not been produced in bulk. The latest predictions for Fl (element 114) could not distinguish between face-centred cubic and hexagonal close-packed structures, which were predicted to be close in energy. No predictions are available for elements 115–117.

Table

Unusual structures

Usual crystal structures

Close packed metal structures
Many metals adopt close packed structures i.e. hexagonal close packed and  face-centred cubic structures (cubic close packed). A simple model for both of these is to assume that the metal atoms are spherical and are packed together in the most efficient way (close packing or closest packing). In closest packing every atom has 12 equidistant nearest neighbours, and therefore a coordination number of 12. If the close packed structures are considered as being built of layers of spheres then the difference between hexagonal close packing and face-centred cubic is how each layer is positioned relative to others. Whilst there are many ways that can be envisaged for a regular buildup of layers:
hexagonal close packing has alternate layers positioned directly above/below each other: A,B,A,B,... (also termed P63/mmc, Pearson symbol hP2, strukturbericht  A3) .
face-centered cubic has every third layer directly above/below each other: A,B,C,A,B,C,... (also termed cubic close packing, Fm3m, Pearson symbol cF4,  strukturbericht  A1) .
double hexagonal close packing has layers directly above/below each other, A,B,A,C,A,B,A,C,.... of period length 4 like an alternative mixture of fcc and hcp packing (also termed P63/mmc, Pearson Symbol hP4, strukturbericht  A3' ).
α-Sm packing has a period of 9 layers A,B,A,B,C,B,C,A,C,.... (R3m, Pearson Symbol hR3, strukturbericht C19).

Hexagonal close packed
However, there are deviations from this in some metals where the unit cell is distorted in one direction but the structure still retains the hcp space group—remarkable all the elements have a ratio of lattice parameters c/a < 1.633 (best are Mg and Co and worst Be with c/a ~ 1.568). In others like Zn and Cd the deviations from the ideal change the symmetry of the structure and these have a lattice parameter ratio c/a > 1.85.

Face-centered cubic (cubic close packed)
More content relating to number of planes within structure and implications for glide/slide e.g. ductility.

Double hexagonal close packed
Similar to the ideal hcp structure, the perfect dhcp structure should have a lattice parameter ratio of  In the real dhcp structures of 5 lanthanides (including β-Ce)  variates between 1.596 (Pm) and 1.6128 (Nd). For the four known actinides dhcp lattices the corresponding number vary between 1.620 (Bk) and 1.625 (Cf).

Body centred cubic
This is not a close packed structure. In this each metal atom is at the centre of a cube with 8 nearest neighbors, however the 6 atoms at the centres  of the adjacent cubes are only approximately 15% further away so the coordination number can therefore be considered to be 14 when these are ong one 4 fold axe structure becomes face-centred cubic (cubic close packed).

See also
Crystal structure

References

General

External links
  Strukturbericht Type A  – structure reports for the pure elements
 Crystal Structures for the solid chemical elements at 1 bar

Crystal structure
Chemical elements by crystal structure